Jonuzi is a surname of Albanian origin. Notable people with the surname include:

Fjoart Jonuzi (born 1996), Albanian footballer
Ibush Jonuzi (born 1950), Kosovar politician

See also
Ahmed Januzi (born 1988), Albanian footballer

Surnames of Albanian origin